Khatif may refer to:
 Khatif, Kerman
 Khatif, Mazandaran